Soccer on Turner Sports is a number of programs that currently airs soccer matches in the United States. These matches are from International, European, and American competitions.

Programming

UEFA Champions League

In 2017, Turner Sports announced that they had acquired the rights to air all of the matches from the UEFA Champions League live. The contract originally ran from 2018–2021. Tuner later announced that they would air 4 matches per week on TNT and the remainder of the matches on new streaming service B/R Live. All matches will be commentated through world feed. During the 2019-2020 season, Turner Sports opted out from the rest of the contract after airing 12 round of 16 matches, eventually giving up the rights. It eventually moved to CBS Sports where it became the rightsholder for English-language Broadcasts of the UEFA Champions League.

UEFA Europa League
Turner Sports formerly carried the UEFA Europa League through the same contract as the Champions League programming. While it could have aired the UEFA Europa League final, it was later moved to CBS Sports for the remainder of the 2019-2020 season.

UEFA Super Cup
Through their UEFA contract, the UEFA Super Cup has been broadcast by Turner live on TNT.

2019 Liverpool Pre-season Matches 
Turner Sports aired all Liverpool F.C. pre-season matches during July. Selected matches are broadcast on TNT while all matches are on B/R Live.

FIFA World Cup

Turner Sports aired the 1990 FIFA World Cup live on TNT in the United States. The tournament was hosted by Ernie Johnson. Bob Neal and Mick Luckhurst served as the lead broadcast team. Meanwhile, JP Dellacamera and Randy Hahn were the other play-by-play announcers with Rick Davis and Ty Keough were the other color commentators. Also, utilized by TNT for the 1990 World Cup was Craig Sager and Paul Ryden.

USSF
Turner Sports will air USMNT and USWNT matches for a 8-year deal from 2023 to 2030, replacing ESPN/ABC and Fox Sports. Luke Wileman will handling play-by-play duties, while Sara Walsh hosting studio coverage and Melissa Ortiz reporting on sideline. Joined them as co-commentator or studio analysts will be Julie Foudy, DaMarcus Beasley, Shannon Boxx and Kyle Martino.

References

External links

TNT Soccer Schedule
CBS Wins U.S. Champions League TV Rights From TNT — Here’s Why This Could Actually Be Bad

American live television series
Turner Sports
Association football television series
TNT (American TV network) original programming
Turner Sports
1990s American television series
2010s American television series
Turner Sports